Urnes may refer to:

 Urnes Style
 Urnes Stave Church, whose doorway carvings gave the name to the style

See also
 Urne (disambiguation)
 Urness